The International Film School of Paris (French: École internationale de Création audiovisuelle et de Réalisation, EICAR) is a private film school founded in 1972 by Jean-Paul Vuillin, producer and director of film.

International students
In 2000 the school opened an English speaking department where all film courses were offered in English. In 2008, students from 56 different countries were enrolled in this department. The faculty is  international and industry professionals from all over the world offer their expertise to aspiring filmmakers. The school has one of the most cutting edge, comprehensive film educational programs in Europe. The curriculum includes courses in  both technical and creative crafts. production, directing, cinematography, sound, musical composition, editing, special effects, acting, script writing... Students can either take  degrees  (Bachelor or Masters) in practical hands on film making, and production,  choose to take  short intensive courses,  or  enroll in the one year courses. The school is situated in the heart of France's largest  filming studios, in the ICADE Park/ St Denis, Paris North. The graduation at the school in June 2008 was presided over by Claude Lelouch.

The International Film School of Paris, EICAR,  has a considerable reputation within the European industry as a film school and as an independent, short-film production house. Over 300 short films are produced each year on HD, 35mm, super 16mm and DV.

Cannes Programme
EICAR arranges for 30 of its students to become reporters for a week at the Cannes Film Festival, allocating places on a competitive basis.

The International Film School of Paris strongly believes that a film education must be as practical as possible. We trust that the best classroom for young filmmakers is the actual shooting environment. Film directing students, regardless of whichever programme they are in, are producing short exercises or films weekly.

The Paris international Film School is a college offering students worldwide the opportunity of specializing in film studies in a professional environment where the quality of personal films is pursued to the outmost and where students are given the opportunity of developing their creative and technical knowledge through the practical creation of scripts to the manipulation of sophisticated professional equipment and on to the post production and screening of their films in front of a public and a panel of judges.

The school gathers virtually all media crafts within one training location therefore encouraging students to learn how to work together, just like in the film industry. Young film directors work closely with technical trainees and aspiring actors, which is as close to the real thing you can get as a student.

On the more individual basis the interaction between professor and student at EICAR is encouraged. The practical courses are conducted in small groups enabling the students to improve their communication skills and the art of management, two fundamental attributes required in order to create and sustain a team throughout the shooting of a film.

Location
Eicar Group runs 1 International school in Paris.

External links
School website
 Filmfestival.com review

Film schools in France
Educational institutions established in 1972
Mass media in Paris
1972 establishments in France